Joseph Ettedgui (1936-2010), usually known simply as Joseph, was an influential London-based retailer and founder of the Joseph retail empire. After his death, the chair of the British Fashion Council Harold Tillman described him as: "a great designer, retailer and entrepreneur". Le Figaro fashion editor Godfrey Deeny has described him as: "one of the half dozen greatest fashion retailers in the past half-century".

Early life and career
Born in Casablanca on February 22, 1936, Joseph Ettedgui was the son of a Moroccan Jewish furniture retailer. Joseph’s father considered retailing to be a degrading profession and hoped his son would become a doctor or lawyer. Joseph had no such ambitions and moved to London with his brother Maurice in 1960 to train as a hairdresser. Two years later the brothers opened a hairdressing salon (Salon 33) in King's Road, Chelsea – one of the epicentres of Swinging London. In 1964, their brother Franklin joined them. In an interview in 1989 with the Jewish Chronicle, Joseph said: "I really wanted to be an architect but I'm terribly impatient. I decided to take a course in hairdressing and I loved it; I loved the way you could transform someone in two hours".

Move into fashion retail
Joseph Ettedgui began travelling to Paris to see the ready-to-wear collections. This led to a meeting and early business association with Japanese designer Kenzo Takada. He began to sell Kenzo sweaters in Salon 33, and in 1972 the first Joseph clothes store opened underneath the hairdressing premises. Kenzo sweaters in the store’s window were spotted by then Sunday Times fashion editor Michael Roberts and used in a photo shoot – a move credited with simultaneously launching both minimalist European fashion and the Joseph retail name to a wider UK audience.

A high-tech Norman Foster-designed flagship store opened in Sloane Street, Knightsbridge in 1979, after which Joseph Ettedgui’s place as a retail pioneer was cemented. During the 1980s, own-brand knitwear and clothing were introduced. The Joseph brand expanded into restaurants (Joe’s Café) and homeware (Joseph Pour la Maison). Stores opened across London and other major fashion centres, including New York, Paris and Tokyo.

Influence and legacy
Joseph Ettedgui assisted emerging fashion designers, including Margaret Howell, Katharine Hamnett, John Galliano and Azzedine Alaïa. He also championed architects and interior designers, working with names such as David Chipperfield and Eva Jiricna. British fashion designer John Richmond called him: "the creator of modern retail" and Italian designer and entrepreneur Miuccia Prada commented that Joseph's shops were: "among the most beautiful in the world". London-based Saks Fifth Avenue merchandise director Gail Sackloff recalled how her visiting American fashion buyers always wanted to visit Joseph stores in the 1980s because of the way he merchandised.

Later ventures
After selling the Joseph brand outright to its Japanese licensee in 2005, Joseph Ettedgui turned his attention and fortune to Connolly Luxury Goods, an offshoot of Connolly Leather, and the Belgravia Italian restaurant Il Vaporetto. As of November 2020, the Connolly retail business remains in the ownership of his widow, Isabel.

References

External links

1936 births
2010 deaths
Moroccan fashion designers
British fashion designers
20th-century Moroccan Jews
Moroccan emigrants to England
People from Casablanca
Jewish fashion designers
21st-century British artists
20th-century Moroccan artists
British people of Moroccan-Jewish descent